Tylorstown railway station served the mining community of Tylorstown in Rhondda Cynon Taf, South Wales, between 1877 and 1964.

History & Description
Originally Tylors Town, the station opened in 1877. Tylorstown had a footbridge, two wooden platforms with substantial buildings and a signal box. In 1928, an additional footbridge was installed over the line near Tylorstown to enable the residents of Stanleytown to reach the centre of Tylorstown. The station was also the location of the Pontygwaith Siding, and Tylorstown Upper and Lower Sidings.

The fortunes of the Maerdy Branch declined in the mid-20th Century, and the line was eventually earmarked for closure in the Beeching Axe. The sidings at Tylorstown all closed in 1963. Passenger closure followed in 1964, and the signal box closed in 1966.

After Closure
The platforms of the station were still present in 1988.

References

Disused railway stations in Rhondda Cynon Taf
Former Taff Vale Railway stations
Railway stations in Great Britain opened in 1877
Railway stations in Great Britain closed in 1964
Beeching closures in Wales